Doris Lilian Bailey (6 December 1916 – 30 November 2009) was a New Zealand cricketer who played as a right-handed batter. She played in one Test match for New Zealand in 1949. She played domestic cricket for Wellington.

References

External links
 
 

1916 births
2009 deaths
Cricketers from Wellington City
New Zealand women cricketers
New Zealand women Test cricketers
Wellington Blaze cricketers